David L. Hewitt (born August 12, 1939) is a film director and producer. Among the films he has directed are The Wizard of Mars in 1965, Monsters Crash the Pajama Party also in 1965,  Journey to the Center of Time in 1967, The Mighty Gorga in 1967 and The Girls from Thunder Strip in 1970.

Background
As a teenager he was an illusionist in the Dr. Jeckyll's Strange Show, a travelling spook show. Later, with an interest in getting into the movie business, he contacted Forrest J. Ackerman and offered him a film script. The original script was called Journey into the Unknown. The script was rewritten by Ib Melchior and given a new title of The Time Travellers. His directing debut was Monsters Crash the Pajama Party.

Film work
In addition to The Time Travellers, which he also provided special effects for, and  his directional debut, The Monsters Crash the Pajama Party, he would direct a number of films.

In 1967, he wrote the script for Dr. Terror's Gallery of Horrors, which featured John Carradine. He also directed the film, and along with Ray Dorn, he co-produced it.  It is an anthology film also known as The Blood Suckers, Gallery of Horrors, Gallery of Horror, Return from the Past, and even The Witch's Clock, which is the title of the first segment.<ref>Eye on Science Fiction: 20 Interviews with Classic SF and Horror Filmmakers - edited by Tom Weaver [https://books.google.com/books?id=jFkWaFYqzuQC&dq=%22David+L.+Hewitt%22&pg=PA190 Page 190 - Dr. Terror's Gallery of Horrors (American General, 1967)]</ref> The film, which was basically a capitalization on Dr. Terror's House of Horrors, had in later years achieved a degree of cult status.  In 1968, he directed Hells Chosen Few, a biker movie starring Jody Daniel and Kelly Ross. He also directed  The Mighty Gorga and The Girls from Thunder Strip, both of which featured Megan Timothy.  In The Mighty Gorga, he also played Gorga.  He directed the Nazisploitation film The Tormentors which was released in 1971.

Two of Hewitt's films were retitled Alien Massacre. The retitling appears to have been the unauthorized work of Regal Video, Inc. of New York, New York.  The cover, released on both films, proclaims "Blood flows like water...", and shows a woman in helmet and epaulets (and apparently nothing else) standing in a barren landscape with her arm, bleeding profusely, modestly covering her chest.  These films are The Wizard of Mars (1965), retitled Horrors of the Red Planet in 1988, an uncredited science fiction takeoff of L. Frank Baum's The Wonderful Wizard of Oz (which became public domain in 1957) in which astronaut Dorothy (Eve Bernhart) and three male astronauts follow a golden road to an ancient city to find that the Martians' greatest desire foreshadows Zardoz (1974), another Oz-influenced science fiction film, and the aforementioned Dr. Terror's Gallery of Horrors (1966), which, in spite of the new title, the film does not feature any aliens. The package description described neither film, but rather described an attack on a scientist and his daughter aboard their space vessel.  Neither film depicts a parent-child relationship.

Later years
In later years, he was a visual effects producer for The Quiet American, Rabbit-Proof Fence and Inspector Gadget 2.

Filmography
As directorThe Wizard of Mars (1965), director/producer/writer
 Monsters Crash the Pajama Party (1965 short), director/producer/writer
 Journey to the Center of Time (1967), director/producer/writer
 Dr. Terror's Gallery of Horrors (1967, also known as Gallery of Horror), director/producer/writer
 Hells Chosen Few (1968), director/producer/writer
 The Mighty Gorga (1969), director/producer/writer
 The Girls from Thunder Strip (1970), director/producer/writer
 Pornography USA (1971, documentary)
 The Tormentors (1971, as B. Eagle), director/producer
 The Lucifer Complex'' (1978), director/writer

References

External links

1939 births
Living people
Film directors from San Francisco
Filmmakers from California
American film producers
Film producers from California